The  Little League World Series took place between August 22 and August 26 in Williamsport, Pennsylvania. The Pinkuang Little League of Pintung, Taiwan, defeated the San Ramon Valley Little League of Danville, California, in the championship game of the 32nd Little League World Series.

Teams

Championship Bracket

Position Bracket

Notable players
 Erik Johnson of the San Ramon team went on to play in MLB as an infielder in 1993 and 1994.
 Dave Veres of the Torrejón Air Base team went on to play in MLB as pitcher between 1994 and 2003.
 Al Haynes was an umpire in the 1978 LLWS. He later became the hero pilot of the 1989 United Airlines Flight 232.

External links
1978 Little League World Series
Line scores for the 1978 LLWS

Little League World Series
Little League World Series
Little League World Series